David Salom Fuentes (born 16 October 1984) is a Spanish professional motorcycle racer. He won the 2006 Spanish Supersport Championship.

Motorcycle racing career
Fuentes was born in Palma de Mallorca, Spain. In 2011 he reached second place at Silverstone, third at Aragon and achieved three pole positions at Phillip Island, Silverstone and Estoril. In 2012, Salom was replaced by Iván Silva in the Avintia Blusens team from Motegi after disappointing results. For 2013, Salom has signed to the Czech-based Intermoto Ponyexpres team.

He is the cousin of late Luis Salom.

Career statistics

Supersport World Championship

Races by year

Superbike World Championship

Races by year

Grand Prix motorcycle racing

By season

Races by year
(key) (Races in bold indicate pole position, races in italics indicate fastest lap)

References

External links

Living people
1984 births
Spanish motorcycle racers
Avintia Racing MotoGP riders
Superbike World Championship riders
Supersport World Championship riders
Sportspeople from Palma de Mallorca
MotoGP World Championship riders